Joaquín Gabriel Gómez (born 14 October 1996) is an Argentine hammer thrower.

Gómez won the hammer throw event at the 2012 South American Youth Championships in Athletics in Mendoza, Argentina, breaking the championship record with an 81.15 metre throw.

His father, Daniel Gómez, was the 1977 and 1985 South American hammer throw champion.

Personal bests

Competition record

References

External links
IAAF profile for Joaquín Gómez

1996 births
Living people
Argentine male hammer throwers
Athletes from Buenos Aires
Sportspeople from Avellaneda
South American Games gold medalists for Argentina
South American Games medalists in athletics
Athletes (track and field) at the 2018 South American Games
Athletes (track and field) at the 2019 Pan American Games
Pan American Games competitors for Argentina
Competitors at the 2017 Summer Universiade
Competitors at the 2019 Summer Universiade
South American Games gold medalists in athletics
20th-century Argentine people
21st-century Argentine people